In the Vicinity of the Heart is the sixth studio album by the American country music band Shenandoah. Their only full studio album for Liberty Records, it was released in November 1994 (see 1994 in country music). It is also the final studio album to feature founding members Stan Thorn and Ralph Ezell.

Content
The first single from the album, "Somewhere in the Vicinity of the Heart", features duet vocals from Alison Krauss. This song was Krauss' first Top 40 country hit, peaking at number 7 on the Billboard country charts in 1995. Following it were "Darned If I Don't (Danged If I Do)" at number 4 (it was also their last top 10 hit on the US Country charts), "Heaven Bound (I'm Ready)" at number 24, and "Always Have, Always Will" at number 40. "Heaven Bound (I'm Ready)" was previously recorded by the Oak Ridge Boys from their 1991 album Unstoppable, "Every Fire" was later recorded by Jason Sellers on his 1999 album A Matter of Time and Restless Heart on their 2004 album Still Restless and Neal McCoy on his 2012 album XII, "I Wouldn't Know" was recorded by Reba McEntire in 1998 for her album If You See Him, while "She Could Care Less" was later recorded by Joe Nichols on his 1996 self-titled debut.

Critical reception
Jim Ridley of New Country magazine gave the album two-and-a-half stars out of five. He highlighted "I Wouldn't Know" and the title track as standouts for their production and vocal performances, but thought that the song selection otherwise followed too closely to that of Under the Kudzu and that the album did not seem to take any chances.

Track listing

Personnel

Shenandoah
Ralph Ezell – bass guitar, background vocals
Mike McGuire – drums, background vocals
Marty Raybon – lead vocals, acoustic guitar
Jim Seales – electric guitar, background vocals
Stan Thorn – piano, keyboards, background vocals

Additional musicians
Bruce Bouton – pedal steel guitar, slide guitar
Dennis Burnside – piano, Hammond B-3 organ
Mark Casstevens – acoustic guitar, ukulele
Rob Hajacos – fiddle, "electric hoedown tools" 
John Barlow Jarvis – piano, synthesizer
Alison Krauss – duet vocals on "Somewhere in the Vicinity of the Heart"
Brent Mason – electric guitar
John Wesley Ryles – background vocals
Dennis Wilson – background vocals
Lonnie Wilson – drums, percussion

Chart performance

References

1994 albums
Liberty Records albums
Shenandoah (band) albums
Albums produced by Don Cook